Santana is a municipality located in the southeast of the state of Amapá in Brazil. Santana is a suburb of Macapá, the state capital, and the two cities make up the Metropolitan Area of Macapá. Its location is nearly on the equator. The planet's second longest river, the Amazon is to the south.

Santana was historically a part of Macapá. In 1981 it was elevated to the category of a District of Macapá. It became a separate municipality in the state of Amapá on 1 January 1982.

History

The history of Santana began in 1753 when Ilha de Santana, an island in the Amazon River in front of the city of Santana, became an official settlement. The settlement on the coast started to develop in the 1950s when manganese was discovered in Serra do Navio. Santana has developed into the main harbour and industrial centre for the state, and has become the second most populous city. In 1990, a campus of the Federal University of Amapá was opened in Santana.

Geography

Neighbouring municipalities

Macapá, north and east
Mazagão, southwest
Porto Grande, northwest

Port of Santana

The Port of Santana was built in 1980. It was originally intended for river transport, but due to its favourable position, it quickly developed into a main harbour for international transport to and from the Caribbean, United States and European Union. The harbour was inaugurated on 6 May 1982, and became a public company in 2002.

The Port of Santana also provides ferry services.

Districts

In 2001 Santana was officially divided into six districts:

 The city of Santana 
 
 Igarapé do Lago
 Ilha de Santana
 
 Pirativa

Sports
Independente Esporte Clube and Santana Esporte Clube are the football clubs based in the city of Santana.

Notable people
 Fabrício Guerreiro (1990), mixed martial artist
 Raulian Paiva (1995), mixed martial artist

References

External links
Official website 

Municipalities in Amapá
Populated places in Amapá
Populated places on the Amazon